Home from Home is a BBC sitcom set in the Lake District, England. The Hackett family buy a wooden lodge on a park site and immediately father Neil is trying to outdo the better off neighbours. The sitcom began as a pilot episode, part of the BBC Two's New on Two series featuring potential sitcom ideas. A full series was commissioned in December 2016, and debuted on BBC One in April 2018.

Synopsis
Home from Home revolves around the class divide between the Hackett family and the Dillons. The Hacketts, after saving for years to be able to afford a lodge holiday home in the Lake District, find that other second home owners are not quite on the same level as them. Their most immediate neighbours, the Dillons, have the most upmarket lodge on the site, having downgraded from their villa in Ibiza. A class-war emerges between the Dillons and the Hacketts, particularly between Penny and Neil: she describes the family as "The Stoke Massive". Robert and Fiona, on the other hand, get on well and the Hackett's eldest son is clearly in love with the Dillons' adopted daughter, Petra.

Cast
Johnny Vegas as Neil Hackett
Emilia Fox as Penny Dillon
Adam James as Robert Dillon
Niky Wardley as Fiona Hackett (after pilot)
Oscar Kennedy as Garth Hackett
Harvey Chaisty as Little Neil Hackett
Olive Gray as Petra Dillon
Pearce Quigley as Thistlewaite
Susan Calman as Lorraine Sykes
Paul Barber as Fieldhouse
Elaine Paige as Mercy Hackett
Joanna Page as Fiona Hackett (pilot only)

Production
The pilot and six-part series were filmed at the Skiddaw View Holiday Park, Ullswater and Pooley Bridge.

The pilot, which was broadcast in 2016, originally featured Joanna Page as Fiona Hackett. Page did not return for the full series and was replaced by Niky Wardley.

Episodes

Critical reception
Gabriel Tate, writing in The Telegraph, gave the sitcom three stars out of five and whilst acknowledging that the sitcom had many traits in common with other "over the garden-fence sitcoms" it was "fundamentally good-natured, resolutely unambitious and a lively addition to a crowded field”.

References

External links
 
 
 

2016 British television series debuts
2018 British television series endings
2010s British sitcoms
BBC television sitcoms
English-language television shows
Television series about families
Television shows set in the Lake District
Works about social class